Birčna Vas is a settlement in the Municipality of Novo Mesto in southeastern Slovenia. It lies on the railway line from Ljubljana to Metlika. It is part of the traditional region of Lower Carniola and is now included in the Southeast Slovenia Statistical Region.

Name
Birčna Vas was attested in written sources as Wericzendorf in 1436.

References

External links
Birčna Vas on Geopedia

Populated places in the City Municipality of Novo Mesto